Wilmer Font Gómez (born May 24, 1990) is a Venezuelan professional baseball pitcher in the San Diego Padres organization. He has previously played in Major League Baseball (MLB) for the Tampa Bay Rays, Texas Rangers, Los Angeles Dodgers, Oakland Athletics, New York Mets, and Toronto Blue Jays and in the Korea Baseball Organization for the SSG Landers.

Professional athletic career

Texas Rangers
The Texas Rangers signed Font as an international free agent on July 11, 2006. He began his professional career in 2007, playing for the Arizona League Rangers. That year, he went 2–3 with a 4.53 ERA in 14 games (10 starts), striking out 61 batters in  innings. In 2008, he again pitched for the AZL Rangers, going 1–0 with a 10.38 ERA in three starts, striking out six batters in  innings (that year he allowed only one hit and one walk, but he hit three batters).

In 2009, Font went 8–3 with a 3.49 ERA in 29 games (24 starts), striking out 105 batters in  innings for the Hickory Crawdads. He split 2010 between the Crawdads and Bakersfield Blaze, going 5–3 with a 4.35 ERA in 16 starts, striking out 85 batters in  innings. His 2010 season ended early when he came down with an elbow injury on July 7 which led to him undergoing Tommy John surgery after the season. He missed the entire 2011 season while recovering from the surgery. He returned in 2012 and pitched in 33 games (19 starts) primarily with the Myrtle Beach Pelicans and Frisco RoughRiders. He had a 4.03 ERA.

Font made his major league debut for the Rangers on September 18, 2012, pitching one scoreless inning of relief against the Los Angeles Angels of Anaheim. He pitched two innings over three games for the Rangers, allowing two earned runs and striking out one batter. His first MLB strikeout was against Mike Trout of the Angels on September 28.

Font spent most of the 2013 season in the minors, pitching in 26 games for Frisco and 16 for the Round Rock Express. In 42 games, he had a 1.90 ERA.  He also pitched in two games in the majors for the Rangers in July, and did not allow a run in  innings. He spent the entire 2014 season with Frisco and was 1–2 with a 3.48 ERA in 29 games. Font was designated for assignment on October 2, 2014.

Ottawa Champions
Font signed with the Cincinnati Reds in the offseason, but was released on March 31, 2015. He then signed with the Ottawa Champions of the Canadian American Association of Professional Baseball for the 2015 season. He made 20 starts for the Champions and was 10–4 with a 4.09 ERA. He returned to Ottawa to start the 2016 season and began 2–2 with a 4.18 ERA in 10 games (9 starts).

Toronto Blue Jays
On July 4, 2016, Font's contract with the Ottawa Champions was purchased by the Toronto Blue Jays. He pitched in 12 games (11 starts) in the Blue Jays farm system with the New Hampshire Fisher Cats and Buffalo Bisons and was 4–4 with a 3.68 ERA.

Los Angeles Dodgers
Font signed a minor league contract with the Los Angeles Dodgers in December 2016. He was assigned to the Triple-A Oklahoma City Dodgers to begin the season and was selected as the starting pitcher for the Pacific Coast League mid-season all-star team. Font started 25 games for Oklahoma City in 2017 and was 10–8 with a 3.42 ERA and 178 strikeouts, setting a new team franchise record and winning him the Pacific Coast League Pitcher of the Year Award.

Font was promoted to the majors with the Dodgers on September 2. He appeared in just three games for the Dodgers, allowing seven runs in just  innings of work with three strikeouts and four walks. He began 2018 in the Dodgers bullpen and allowed 13 runs and 18 hits in  innings over six games, including picking up the loss in two extra inning games. On April 23, he was designated for assignment and removed from the active roster.

Oakland Athletics
On April 25, 2018, the Dodgers traded Font to the Oakland Athletics in exchange for minor leaguer Logan Salow. He posted an ERA of 14.85 in 4 appearances before being designated for assignment on May 23, 2018.

Tampa Bay Rays
On May 25, 2018, the Athletics traded Font to the Tampa Bay Rays in exchange for minor league pitcher Peter Bayer. Font found immediate success with the Rays posting a 1.67 ERA in 9 games (4 starts) over 27 innings before being placed on the 60-day disabled list with a right lat strain.

New York Mets
On May 6, 2019, the Rays traded Font to the New York Mets for cash considerations or a player to be named later. On July 12, Font was designated for assignment. In 15 appearances (3 starts), Font was 1–2 with 24 strikeouts in 31 innings.

Toronto Blue Jays (second stint)
On July 17, 2019, Font was traded to the Toronto Blue Jays in exchange for cash considerations. Font was used as an opener upon being acquired from the Mets. He appeared in 23 games (14 starts), striking out 53 in  innings. With the 2020 Toronto Blue Jays, Font appeared in 21 games, compiling a 1–3 record with 9.92 ERA and 15 strikeouts in 16.1 innings pitched. On September 24, 2020, Font was designated for assignment. He was outrighted on September 28. Font rejected the outright assignment and elected free agency the next day.

SSG Landers
On October 31, 2020, Font signed a one-year, $1 million deal with the SK Wyverns of the KBO League. The Wyverns rebranded as the SSG Landers in the offseason. Font posted an 8–5 record with a 3.46 ERA and 157 strikeouts over 25 starts. On December 17, 2021. 

Font re-signed with the Landers for the 2022 season on a one-year, $1.5 million deal. In his season debut for the Landers, Font tossed 9.0 perfect innings against the NC Dinos, but was not credited with a perfect game as he was replaced by reliever Kim Taek-hyeong in the bottom of the 10th inning in the 4-0 victory. He became a free agent following the 2022 season.

San Diego Padres
On January 5, 2023, Font signed a minor league contract with the San Diego Padres organization.

See also
 List of Major League Baseball players from Venezuela

References

External links

1990 births
Living people
Arizona League Rangers players
Bakersfield Blaze players
Buffalo Bisons (minor league) players
Frisco RoughRiders players
Hickory Crawdads players
Leones del Caracas players
Los Angeles Dodgers players
Major League Baseball pitchers
Major League Baseball players from Venezuela
Myrtle Beach Pelicans players
New Hampshire Fisher Cats players
New York Mets players
Oakland Athletics players
Oklahoma City Dodgers players
Ottawa Champions players
People from La Guaira
Round Rock Express players
Tampa Bay Rays players
Texas Rangers players
Toronto Blue Jays players
Venezuelan expatriate baseball players in Canada
Venezuelan expatriate baseball players in South Korea
Venezuelan expatriate baseball players in the United States